Earle Michale Prescott (born 1 July 1971) is a former British Virgin Islands cricketer. Prescott was a right-handed batsman who bowled right-arm medium-fast.

In 2006, the British Virgin Islands were invited to take part in the 2006 Stanford 20/20, whose matches held official Twenty20 status. Prescott made a single appearance in the tournament against Saint Lucia in a preliminary round defeat, with him not being called upon to bat in the British Virgin Islands innings, while in Saint Lucia's innings he bowled two wicketless overs which conceded 15 runs.

References

External links
Earle Prescott at ESPNcricinfo
Earle Prescott at CricketArchive

1971 births
Living people
British Virgin Islands cricketers